Tullia Drives over the Corpse of her Father is a 1765 painting by French historical painter Jean Bardin which depicts Tullia, the last Queen of Rome and daughter of King Servius Tullius, as she orders her chairioter to drive over her fathers dead body.  Bardin won first prize at the Prix de Rome for the work.

See also
 Tullia driving her Chariot over her Father, by Giuseppe Bartolomeo Chiari
 Tullia Running Her Chariot over the Body of Her Father, by Michel-François Dandré-Bardon
 Tullia Driving her Chariot over the Body of her Father by François-Guillaume Ménageot

References

Further reading
 Women in Livy: Tullia Minor

1765 paintings
Cultural depictions of Tullia Minor
Cultural depictions of Servius Tullius